Col des Ares (elevation ) is a mountain pass located in Haute-Garonne, between Juzet-d'Izaut and Fronsac, some thirty kilometres north of Bagnères-de-Luchon, and south-west of Aspet.

Details of the climbs
Over this distance, the climb gains  in height at an average of 3.9%.

Before reaching Juzet-d'Izaut, the D618 crosses the Col de Buret

Tour de France
The Col des Ares was first used in the Tour de France in 1910 and has appeared frequently since. The leader over the summit in 1910 was Octave Lapize.  It was crossed on Stage 17 of the 2012 tour and in 2014 on stage 16.

Appearances in Tour de France (since 1947) 

From 1947 to 1952, and in 1957, the climb was not classified.

References

External links
Le col des Ares dans le Tour de France depuis 1947  
Col des Ares on Google Maps (Tour de France classic climbs)

Mountain passes of the Pyrenees
Climbs in cycle racing in France
Mountain passes of Haute-Garonne